Azada can mean:

 a grub hoe, a type of hoe (tool)
 Azada (video game), an adventure-puzzle casual game